Joseph William Grice (born 25 July 1952) is Chief Economist to the Office for National Statistics (ONS).

Early life
He was born in Tamworth in Staffordshire. He was educated at Worcester College, Oxford, receiving a BA in PPE in 1972.

Career

HM Treasury
In HM Treasury he was Director of Macroeconomic Policy, and also the Chief Economist to the Public Services Directorate from 2000-03.

Office for National Statistics
He has been Chief Economist at the ONS since 2007. He is responsible for the production of UK economic statistics such as GDP, inflation and labour market figures.

Note that as of November 2018, the ONS website no longer references Mr. Grice and lists Nick Vaughan as Chief Economist, suggesting that Mr. Grice has changed jobs.

Personal life
He has two sons and one daughter. He married Deborah Wicks in 1976 in Oxford.

References

External links
 Green Growth Knowledge

Alumni of Worcester College, Oxford
British economists
Civil servants in the Office for National Statistics
People from Tamworth, Staffordshire
1952 births
Living people